Pizza Man is a 2011 American superhero comedy film directed by Joe Eckardt, written by Jonathan Kapoor and Marco Mannone, and starring Frankie Muniz and Diamond Dallas Page.

Plot
The film revolves around Matt Burns (Muniz), a dorky pizza delivery boy who is forced to ingest a genetically-engineered tomato that was designed to create super soldiers. Matt soon stumbles into a hostile corporate takeover and he must use his new-found powers to save himself, the world, and the girl of his dreams.  Matt quickly learns that he can no longer be a pizza boy, and must become a hero, the PIZZA MAN.

Cast
 Frankie Muniz as Matt Burns/Pizza Man
 Dallas Page as Kryder/The Big Cheese
 Adam West as Himself
 Roddy Piper as Himself
 Stan Lee as Himself
 Jason Marsden as Professor Baldini
 Anthony Denison as Government Investor
 Leonard Roberts as Leo

References

External links

2010s superhero films
American superhero films
2010s English-language films
2010s American films